Harmonia Caelestis is a cycle of 55 sacred  cantatas attributed to the Hungarian composer  Paul I, 1st Prince Esterházy of Galántha (1635–1713) and published in 1711. They are in the Baroque style and incorporate traditional Hungarian and German melodies. Each of the cantatas consists of one movement. They are composed for solo voices (the majority for one solo voice, although there are some duets), choir, and orchestra (including violas, violone, harp, bassoon, theorba, violins, flutes, trumpets, organ, timpani).

Péter Esterházy's 2000 novel, Harmonia Caelestis, takes its name from the composition.

Recordings
Esterházy: Harmonia Caelestis – Mária Zádori, Márta Fers (sopranos), Katalin Gémes (mezzo-soprano), Katalin Károlyi (contralto), Gábor Kállay (tenor), József Moldvay (bass); Savaria Vocal Ensemble, Capella Savaria, conducted by Pál Németh. Label: Hungaroton HCD31148-49
Christmas Baroque Music – contains Harmonia Caelestis No. 1 "Sol recedit igneus" and No. 7 "Cur fles, Jesu". Label: Capriccio C10558.

References

Fleming, Shirley, "Esterhazy: Harmonia Caelestis", Opera News, February 1995. Accessed via subscription 22 September 2009.
Györffy, Miklós "Everything and Nothing: Péter Esterházy, Harmonia Caelestis, Budapest, Magvetõ, 2000, The Hungarian Quarterly, Volume XLI, No. 4, Autumn 2000.
Sadie, Julie Anne (ed.), Companion to Baroque Music, Oxford University Press, 1998, p. 247. 
Szabolcsi, Bence, Chapter IV, The Seventeenth Century, Virginal Literature and Church Music,  A Concise History of Hungarian Music (Translated from the Hungarian by Sara Karig and Fred MacNicol, revised by Florence Knepler), Zeneműkiadó, 1955. Accessed 23 September 2009.

External links
Songs from Harmonia Caelestis with baryton accompaniment (performance on YouTube)
Video: "O, quam dulcis", "Iesum ardentibus", and "Ave maris stella from Harmonia Caelestis, sung by Andrea Rost accompanied by the Liszt Ferenc Kamarazenekar.

Cantatas
Baroque compositions